This is a list of state beverages as designated by the various states of the United States. The first known usage of declaring a specific beverage a "state beverage" within the US began in 1965 with Ohio designating tomato juice as their official beverage. The most popular choice for state beverage designation is milk (or a flavored milk) with 22 out of the 30 entities (28 states and 2 territories with official beverages) making milk their official beverage, while Rhode Island chose coffee-flavored milk.

Table

Notes

References

External links

Beverages
US state beverages
US state beverages
State beverages